Steve, Stephen, or Steven Jordan may refer to:

Music
 Steve Jordan (guitarist) (1919–1993), American jazz guitarist
 Steve Jordan (drummer) (born 1957), American drummer, studio musician
 Steve Jordan (accordionist) (born Esteban Jordan) (1939–2010), American conjunto (norteño) and Tejano musician
 Stevie J (Steven Jordan, born 1973), American musician, record producer, songwriter and television personality

Sports
 Steve Jordan (American football) (born 1961), former American football tight end who played for the Minnesota Vikings
 Stephen Jordan (Canadian football) (born 1966), Canadian Football League defensive back
 Stephen Jordan (footballer) (born 1982), English footballer

Other
 Stephen Jordan (politician) (1886–1975), Irish Fianna Fáil politician
 Stephen Jordan (writer) (born 1986), English writer, playwright and director
 Steven L. Jordan (born 1956), Civil Affairs officer for the United States Army Reserve